Jōno Station is the name of two train stations in Japan:

Jōno Station (JR Kyushu)
Jōno Station (Kitakyushu Monorail)